Jimmy Oliver (born July 30, 1973) is a former Canadian football wide receiver in the Canadian Football League who played for the BC Lions, Ottawa Renegades, and Toronto Argonauts. He played college football for the TCU Horned Frogs.

References

1973 births
Living people
American football wide receivers
Canadian football wide receivers
BC Lions players
Ottawa Renegades players
Toronto Argonauts players
TCU Horned Frogs football players
Players of American football from Dallas
Players of Canadian football from Dallas